ShuuKaRen was a Japanese Dance-pop and EDM duo formed and managed by LDH since 2016. They were a sub-unit of supergroup E-girls and signed to the record label Sony Music Japan. The duo was composed of sisters Shuuka and Karen Fujii (hence the sub-unit's name), making them the first joint unit of members from the groups Flower and Happiness. This was also the first time Shuuka provided vocals to a musical project besides being a performer.

History

2016: Group formation and debut 
On August 11, 2016, during the last concert of E-girls' third tour E-girls LIVE TOUR 2016 "E.G. SMILE" at Saitama Super Arena, Shuuka and Karen announced the formation of their sub-unit "ShuuKaRen" during the encore. The sisters would promote with this sub-unit whilst carrying on activities with their corresponding groups E-girls, Flower (Shuuka) and Happiness (Karen). It was also revealed that both girls would be singing, making this the first time Shuuka would be providing vocals for an official project since her debut (as a performer) in 2011. Their debut single titled "Universe" was announced to be released on October 5, 2016. Though it was the sisters' first musical release, they did work together prior to the formation with a fashion book, titled Antithese, which garnered critical success and sold over 100,000 units in Japan.

On September 7, it was announced that the unit's second song "Take-A-Shot! feat. PKCZ®" was chosen as the opening theme song for B.LEAGUE 2016-17 SEASON.

On September 9, "Universe" was released as a digital single prior to the physical release of their single album.

On September 22, their second digital single "Take-a-Shot!" featuring PKCZ® was released. It was later on included as  b-side alongside "Tricky" on their debut single. The duo also held their first performance of the song "Take-A-Shot! feat. PKCZ®" during the opening ceremony of the B.League on September 22.

On September 24, the duo starred in their first TV commercial for a new candy product from UHA called e-maのど飴 モーフィング  together. Their song "Tricky" was chosen as the title song for the CM.

2017-2018: Third digital single and Shuuka's retirement 
On October 22, 2017, Shuuka announced the third digital single of the duo titled "LOVE YOUR LIFE / Parallel Synchronicity" while also announcing her temporary hiatus due to health problems. The single was released on November 10, 2017. “LOVE YOUR LIFE” was used as a TV commercial song for a KOSÉ FASIO TV CM in which both Shuuka and Karen appeared. "Parallel Synchronization" produced by m-flo was also chosen as the theme song for B.LEAGUE CHAMPIONSHIP 2016-17.

On December 31, Shuuka announced to have graduated from the unit and retired from entertainment industry due to worsening symptoms of cervical spinal disc herniation. As result of her leaving, and with only Karen staying, the unit disbanded. On January 15, 2018, ShuuKaRen's website, the group's section on E.G.family mobile and accounts on Instagram and Twitter were closed, along with Shuuka's personal blog on E.G.family mobile being also closed and removed.

Members

Discography

Single

Digital Singles

Tie-up

References

External links 

Japanese girl groups
LDH (company) artists
Japanese musical duos
Musical groups established in 2016
2016 establishments in Japan